Skittles, a brand name of candy products produced by the Wm. Wrigley Jr. Company, come in a wide variety of flavors. Most of the varieties are available only in particular regions of the world. The first flavor was Original Fruit Skittles, first released in Europe in 1974, and then in the United States in 1979. Earlier Skittles products tended to focus on fruit flavors; more recent products have branched out to include flavors such as chocolate, bubble gum, popcorn, mint, and sours.

The original Skittles flavors in the United States (and other countries except for Europe and Australia) are orange, lemon, lime, grape and strawberry. In 2013, Skittles changed its original flavor line-up to include green apple, causing a consumer backlash. Green apple also replaced lime in the sour packets. It was rumored that the reason behind this is the green apple flavor outperforming lime in taste tests. A "Long Lost Lime" variation of Skittles was released in summer 2017 and 2018, bringing the lime flavor back to the original mix of Skittles for a limited time only. In September 2021, it was announced that lime would be permanently returning to the original Skittles flavor in October 2021, replacing green apple for the first time since 2013.

List

References

Skittles
Skittles
Skittles